Omphalia tralucida is a species of fungus in the family Tricholomataceae. First described scientifically by Donald Everett Bliss in 1938, it causes decline disease in the date palm (Phoenix dactylifera).

References 

Fungi described in 1938
Fungi of North America
Fungal plant pathogens and diseases
Palm diseases
Food plant pathogens and diseases
Tricholomataceae